Helenanomalon is a genus of ichneumon wasp belonging to the subfamily Anomaloninae. It contains two species, which are endemic to the island of Saint Helena in the South Atlantic Ocean.

References 

Ichneumonidae